The F. W. "Dinty" Moore Trophy is awarded annually by the Ontario Hockey League to the first-year goaltender with the best goals against average during the regular season who has played a minimum of 1320 minutes in goal. The trophy is named after Port Colborne, Ontario, native Francis Moore. Moore was a member of the 1936 Port Arthur Bearcats, which won the silver medal for Canada in ice hockey at the 1936 Winter Olympics. Moore was president of the Ontario Hockey Association from 1942 to 1945, and was made a lifetime member of the OHA in 1962.

Winners
List of winners of the F. W. "Dinty" Moore Trophy.

See also
 List of Canadian Hockey League awards

References

External links
 Ontario Hockey League

Ontario Hockey League trophies and awards
Awards established in 1976